Henry Hibbard may refer to:

 Harry Hibbard, American politician
 Henry Hibbard (cricketer), English cricketer